Edgar Díaz Serrano (born February 8, 1964) is a retired Major League Baseball shortstop. He played during two seasons at the major league level for the Milwaukee Brewers. He was signed as an amateur free agent by the Brewers in 1982. Díaz played his first professional season (in American baseball) with their Rookie league Pikeville Brewers in 1982, and his last with the Toronto Blue Jays' Triple-A Syracuse Chiefs in 1995.

See also
 List of Major League Baseball players from Puerto Rico

References
"Edgar Diaz Statistics". The Baseball Cube. 22 January 2008.
"Edgar Diaz Statistics". Baseball-Reference. 22 January 2008.

External links

1964 births
Living people
Beloit Brewers players
Chattanooga Lookouts players
Denver Zephyrs players
El Paso Diablos players
Las Vegas Stars (baseball) players
Major League Baseball infielders
Major League Baseball players from Puerto Rico
Memphis Chicks players
Milwaukee Brewers players
Nashville Sounds players
Omaha Royals players
Olmecas de Tabasco players
Pikeville Brewers players
Puerto Rican expatriate baseball players in Canada
Puerto Rican expatriate baseball players in Mexico
Stockton Ports players
Syracuse Chiefs players
Vancouver Canadians players
Pikeville Cubs players